Marcus Thomas Jackson Hall (born 24 March 1976) is an English former footballer who played as a defender from 1994 until 2011.

He had two spells with Coventry City, playing in the Premier League in his first, as well as playing in the Football League for Nottingham Forest, Stoke City and Northampton Town. He was also contracted to Southampton whilst a Premier League team but failed to make any appearances. During the 1996–97 campaign he was handed 8 England U21 caps, scoring twice.

Club career
Hall was born in Coventry and began his career with his local side, Coventry City. He progressed through the youth ranks at Highfield Road and made his debut against Tottenham Hotspur on New Year's Eve in 1994–95 with the "Sky Blues" losing 4–0. His first start was a televised home match against Manchester United which Hall described as a 'frightening experience'. Hall spent eight seasons with the Sky Blues making 157 appearances scoring four goals. He left Coventry to join Nottingham Forest in the 2002–03 season, but only played one game against Portsmouth for Forest before moving back to the Premier League with Southampton where he failed to make an appearance.

Hall joined Stoke City in December 2002. He played in 27 matches in 2002–03 helping the club avoid relegation on the final day of the season. In 2003–04 Hall played in 38 matches as Stoke finished in mid-table. He played in 22 matches in 2004–05 and scored his only goal for Stoke against Derby County on 30 August 2004. He made a return to Coventry City in January 2005 on a free transfer.

He spent the next six seasons with Coventry making 151 appearances and was granted a testimonial match against Everton following 10 years of service with Coventry which ended in a 2–2 draw. At the end of the 2009–10 season, Coventry City told Hall he was surplus to requirements and he was subsequently released. Hall signed for Northampton Town on a one-year deal on 1 August 2010. In May 2011, along with seven other players, he was told his contract would not be renewed by the club after making 28 appearances.

International career
Hall is a former captain of the England U21s, and has scored goals at this level. He has also played in an England B international.

Career statistics
Source:

References

External links
 

1976 births
Footballers from Coventry
Living people
Association football defenders
English footballers
England under-21 international footballers
Coventry City F.C. players
Nottingham Forest F.C. players
Southampton F.C. players
Stoke City F.C. players
Northampton Town F.C. players
Premier League players
English Football League players